{{Infobox public transit
| name = Mumbai Suburban Railway
| image = Indian Railways Suburban Railway Logo.svg
| imagesize = 75px
| image2 = Western-Railway-Medha-EMU.jpg
| imagesize2 = 250px
| caption2 = A recently introduced Medha EMU , with exactly the same design as Bombardier rakes.
| locale = Mumbai Metropolitan Region
| Also_called_as = Local Train
| transit_type = Suburban Rail
| began_operation = 
| train_length = 12 or 15 coaches
| system_length = 
| lines = 7
| stations = 150
| ridership = 75.93 lakh/7.59 million (2016–17)
| annual_ridership = 2.2264 billion
| headquarters = Chhatrapati Shivaji Maharaj Terminus (CR)  (WR)
| website = 
| el =  overhead catenary
| average_speed = 
| top_speed = 
| track_gauge = 
| operator = Central Railways
 (Central line
 Harbour line
 Trans-Harbour line
 Nerul–Uran line
 Panvel–Karjat line
 Panvel–Diva–Vasai line)Western Railways (Western line only)
| alt = 
| caption = 
| owner = Indian Railways
| area served = 
| line_number = 
| start = 
| end = 
| chief_executive = 
| character = 
| vehicles = 
| map = 
| map_state = 
| native_name = मुंबई उपनगरीय रेल्वे
}}

The Mumbai Suburban Railway (Marathi: मुंबई उपनगरीय रेल्वे) (colloquially called local trains or simply locals) consists of exclusive inner suburban railway lines augmented by commuter rail on main lines serving outlying suburbs to serve the Mumbai Metropolitan Region.

The daily commuters constitute around 40% of the daily commuters of Indian Railways. By annual ridership (2.64 billion), the Mumbai Suburban Railway is one of the busiest commuter rail systems in the world and arguably the worst rated by riders anywhere in the world. It has killed estimated 50,000+ passengers in the last two decades without any significant upgrade in safety rules, infrastructure or future lookout. Trains run from 04:00 until 01:00, and some trains also run up to 02:30 or 03:00. It is the first suburban rail network in India.

History

The Mumbai Suburban Railway is an offshoot of the first passenger railway to be built by the British East India Company, and is also the oldest railway system in Asia. The 14-coach train took 1.25 h to complete the  journey, with a halt at Bhandup to refill the train's water tanks.

The next major train was run between Virar and Churchgate by the Bombay, Baroda and Central India Railway (now Western Railway), in April 1867.  was also added as a station on this route, but later shut down.
On 3 February 1925, the first EMU Service was started from Victoria Terminus (now Chhatrapati Shivaji Maharaj Terminus) to Coorla Harbour (now Kurla) on the Central line which was run on 1.5 kV DC traction and also started on the Western line from Churchgate to Borivali on 5 January 1928. By 2016, the entire network had been converted to 25 kV 50 Hz AC traction.

The Bombay Railway History Group has been striving to document railway heritage along these lines.

Rolling stock

The suburban services are run by electric multiple units (EMUs) in 191 rakes (train sets) of 12-car and 15-car composition. To alleviate the problems of overcrowding, the nine-car trains have been phased out and replaced with 12-car ones. 15-coach trains were introduced on 21 November 2009. However, these are few in number. Equipment makers include DMU(Direct Multiple Unit), Jessop, Siemens, Bombardier, and Medha. The trains are manufactured at the Integral Coach Factory in Chennai, Tamil Nadu. All routes are electrified at  power supply from overhead lines. The Indian Railways plans to build a 700 MW gas-based plant in Thakurli to generate electricity to run the Mumbai trains.

Manufacturing

The old BHEL non-AC rakes are on the verge of being scrapped.

On 12 November 2007, the first of 129 new 12-coach rakes with upgraded facilities was inducted into the fleet of the Western Railways under the MUTP project. These rakes are popularly called Siemens rakes and have 1xxx and 2xxx numbering system. The coaches are built of stainless steel, and have non-cushioned seats, emergency fluorescent lights, bigger windows with polycarbonate panes, better suspension systems, roof-mounted forced ventilation to reduce carbon dioxide levels in packed trains, and GPS based passenger information systems in all coaches. The new rakes are much cooler and airy than the old EMUs. The motors of the new rakes also make less noise than the older ones. Since 2010, the front of the EMUs is painted yellow so that the maintenance workers on the tracks can see the train easily. These rakes have been procured under the project at a total cost of  19 billion (US$431.0 million). Siemens 5 rakes that had to be delivered as part of the first phase were sent to the city in early January 2014.

New EMUs with Bombardier Electrical procured under the World Bank-funded Mumbai Urban Transport Project-2 built at the Integral Coach Factory (ICF) in Chennai started arriving into Mumbai by April 2014. They have 5xxx numbering system. The first of these trains, to be run on Western Railway, was flagged off by Railway Minister Suresh Prabhu at Lokmanya Tilak Terminus, Kurla on Central Railway on Sunday, 27 October 2013. However, a delay of two years was anticipated due to the demands of automatic sliding doors on the trains. Under the Make in India initiative, the first Indian made rake was made by Medha. They have 6xxx series numbering. 9 car trains have a capacity of 2,628 (876 seated and 1,752 standing). 12 car trains have a capacity of 3,504 (1,168 seated and 2,336 standing). In fall 2013, brand new 12 car rakes were introduced on the railway. On 6 November 2019, the 5533-5536 rake of Mumbai Suburban Railway, called Uttam rake which also manufactured by the ICF was introduced and ran on Western Line.

Air-conditioned rakes

Discussion on AC coaches first began in 2002 and was planned to be introduced in 2013. However, major delays in finalizing the rakes' design and procurement of material deferred the project.

The rake has a seating capacity of 1,028 passengers, and standing room for up to 6,000 passengers. The 12 coach rake is configured as two sets of 6 interconnected bogies, meaning passengers can walk between coaches but only up to a maximum of 6 coaches. The train is also equipped with a new electrical system and software, automatic doors with emergency opening features, and GPS-based destination display on LED indicators. The old system of pulling a chain to halt the train was replaced by four intercoms per coach that enable commuters to communicate with the driver.

Both CR and WR competed to acquire the rake, with WR even announcing a time table for operating the air-conditioned rake. Union Railway Minister Suresh Prabhu announced that the rake would be transferred to CR on 16 March 2016. However, at a height of 4.335 meters the rake exceeds the maximum clearance height of 4.270 meters for EMU coaches on the Central Line. In particular, the rake cannot clear some of the low-height British-era bridges between CSMT and Kurla. Then Central Railway general manager Sunil Kumar Sood insisted that CR was conduct trials and operate the rake on the Harbour Line. After acquiring the rake, CR conducted tests, safety, and mobility checks, and trial runs under the supervision of the RDSO. However, following Sood's retirement, CR abandoned plans to operate the rake in December 2016. CR informed the Railway Board that it could not operate the rake due to the clearance issue, and the Railway Board directed them to transfer the rake to WR. The rake was transferred to WR on 12 May 2017. WR General Manager Anil Kumar Gupta stated that rake would begin commercial operations on the Western Line after WR conducted its own tests and trial runs and receiving regulatory approvals. Although there are some clearance issues on the Western Line as well, Gupta stated that these could be rectified.

The First AC EMU was Flagged off on 25 December 2017 in WR. The first  AC local train in Mumbai began operation in December 2017 and crossed the 10 lakh passenger mark within the first five months. The summer months of March and April saw over 3 lakh passengers take the AC local each month. The train, operated by Western Railway (WR), currently plies between Churchgate and Virar. It has a seating capacity of 1,028 seats and can carry 5,964 passengers. New halts were introduced after commuters demand at Marine Lines, Charni Road, Grant Road, Dahisar, Mira Road, Naigaon, Nallasopara. Data shows that among all stations between Churchgate and Virar. Borivali was the highest earner for the AC train. Two more AC local rakes were introduced and now, the services run all days of the week.

The fourth air-conditioned rake on Mumbai Suburban Rail Network & first for Central Railway has been commissioned on Trans-harbour line from Thane to Panvel / Vashi from 30 January 2020. The fifth air-conditioned rake on Mumbai Suburban Rail Network & first for Central Railway Main Line was commissioned between Mumbai Chhatrapati Shivaji Maharaj Terminus and Kalyan on 17 December 2020.  After a gap of 3 years, the first 12-coach fully-vestibuled AC Local Train made by Medha was commissioned on Western Railway on 19th December, 2022. Under the MUTP-III and MUTP-IIIA project, Western Railway has decided to procure more AC local trains and convert the entire fleet into AC akin to Kolkata Metro. The BHEL Made AC Local Trains have 7xxx series numbering and the Medha made AC local trains have 8xxx series numbering.

Network

The Mumbai Suburban Railway system is operated by Indian Railways two zonal divisions Western Railways (WR) and Central Railways (CR). The fast commuter rail corridors on Central Railway as well as Western Railway are shared with long-distance and freight trains, while inner suburban services operate on exclusive parallel tracks. WR operates the Western Line and CR operates the Central Line, Harbour Line, Trans-Harbour Line, Vasai–Roha Line and Neral–Matheran & Panvel–Karjat line.

Central Line

The Central Line in Mumbai consists of 3 major corridors, which bifurcate as they run into suburban satellite towns.
Two corridors (one local and the other through) of the Central Railway run from Chhatrapati Shivaji Maharaj Terminus (CSMT) to Kalyan, where it bifurcates into two lines – one to Kasara in the north-east and the other to Khopoli in the south-east. These two corridors constitute the 'Main' Central Line.

Rolling stock consists of a fleet of AC and alternating current new Bombardier and Siemens EMUs. The major car sheds on this line are at Kurla and Kalwa. There are both fast and slow locals. Slow locals halt at every station, while fast locals' halts vary between Byculla, Dadar, Kurla, Ghatkopar, Vikhroli, Bhandup, Mulund, Thane, Dombivali and Kalyan. All trains plying beyond Kalyan run as slow trains (halting at every station).

Western Line

The Western Line follows the Western Railway northwards from  parallel to the west coast. Local services by electric multiple units (EMUs) ply between Churchgate and Dahanu on exclusive parallel tracks up to  while MEMUs service the section beyond Virar to Dahanu Road. On 16 April 2013 EMU has extended up to Dahanu Road. MEMUs also operate between Dahanu Road and  via a branch line from Bhiwandi Road–Vasai Road. There are EMU carsheds at Mumbai Central,  and Virar. The largest EMU car shed in Asia is located at Virar.

Western Railway's EMU fleet consists of EMUs completely powered by alternating current (25 kV) power. Rolling stock consists of a fleet of AC and alternating current new Bombardier EMUs. EMUs are 12 car or 15 car formations and are differentiated as slow and fast locals. Slow trains halt at all stations, while fast ones halt at Mumbai Central, Dadar, Bandra, Andheri, Borivali, Bhayander, Vasai Road, Virar stations and are preferable over longer distances.

Harbour Line

The Harbour Line is part of the Central Railway, and runs from Chhatrapati Shivaji Maharaj Terminus (CSMT) to Goregaon and Panvel. All Harbour Line services operate as slow services. A branch line from  joins the Western Line at Mahim and continues towards Goregaon. Further construction is ongoing to extend the Western Line branch to Borivali.

The Harbour Line has an interchange station with the mainline at Kurla, where it turns east towards Navi Mumbai. The Harbour Line further bifurcates at Vashi into two lines – one rejoins the main lines at Thane, while the other continues to Panvel. The shed for these trains is in Sanpada. A partial section of the Harbour Line is elevated from Sandhurst Road to Cotton Green.

Trans-Harbour Line

The Trans-Harbour Line which is another part of Central Railway connects Navi Mumbai and Thane. It operates from two separate platforms at Thane to Nerul, where it joins the Harbour line till Panvel and a small branch line from Turbhe goes to Vashi as it runs parallel with the Harbour line. All services on the trans-harbour line are all-stop services. Freight trains share the tracks through a bypass from Airoli to Koparkhairane, after which it goes to a siding in Turbhe for the APMC market godowns.

Vasai Road–Roha Line

The Vasai Road–Roha line is an Intersection chord rail bypass line of the Mumbai Suburban Railway which connects the Western line, Central line and Harbor line of the Western Railway zone and Central Railway zone. Currently this line is used for bypassing freight trains, Express and MEMU Passenger trains. And also construction of a separate Suburban Corridor on this route for more connectivity by the MRVC is going.

Nerul–Uran line

The Nerul–Uran line, also known as the Port line, is another part of the Central Railway connects Navi Mumbai to Uran, which is also in Navi Mumbai, but at its southwestern part. It also operates from the two separate platforms of Nerul and one separate platform of CBD Belapur to Uran, also making connectivity to JNPT in Navi Mumbai directly.

Services

Mumbai Suburban Railway services have trains with four main designations:
 Slow trains: (denoted by an S) stop at every station. These are intended for daily commuters.
 Fast trains: (denoted by an F) run express (skipping stops and going mainly to railway junctions) until a certain station, and from that station onward run like a slow train. These are intended for daily commuters as well as express connectivity to the rest of Indian Railways outbound trains.Air Conditioned trains: (denoted by an AC) which are air-conditioned and can be either fast or slow.

Travel classes

The suburban fleet consists of 12 and 15-coach rakes.
There are two main classes of travel; the First and Second classes. The first class fare is approximately 8 times more expensive than second class and therefore tends to be less crowded during the non rush hours, though at times it is equally or more crowded than the general compartments during rush hour, due to most office employees having a first class transport pass provided by their employer. First class and Senior Citizen compartments also have cushioned seating, while the rest are typically plastic. There are following classes of travel:

 Class I (first class compartment): Commonly known as first class. The coach is designated by red and yellow slant stripes. The location of the same is designated by colouring the platform walls with similar stripes. The price is generally hiked up by eight times to prevent the compartment overcrowding. The seats in this class are leather made.
 Class II (general compartment): Also called second class. The seats in this class are plastic-made.Class I-L (Ladies first class): similar to normal First Class, reserved solely for females, however male children up to the age of 13 can travel in this compartment. Men are not allowed to travel, and may face a penalty. Some of the coaches of ladies compartments are open to general public between 23:15 and 06:30. These are indicated by a note near the doors of the compartments. The coach is designated by red and yellow slant stripes. The location of the same is designated by colouring the platform walls with similar stripes. This compartment is often adjacent to the ladies general compartment.Class II-L (Ladies second class): This compartment is reserved solely for females, however male children up to the age of 13 can travel in this compartment. Men are not allowed to travel and can face a penalty. Some of the coaches of ladies compartments are open to the general public between 23:15 and 06:30. These are indicated by a note near the doors of the compartments. The coach is designated by green and yellow slant stripes. The location of the same is designated by colouring the platform walls with similar stripes.Divyangjan (Handicapped, Pregnant Ladies and Cancer patients compartment): for people with disabilities or cancer. On a platform, one can locate these by signs or by following a beeping sound indicator for the visually impaired, or also by following a yellow tactile path with a walking stick. These coaches are open to all the genders. One needs a valid certificate of disability to board the compartment. Failure to do so may result in a penalty.Senior citizens: is reserved for passengers above the age of 60. These coaches are open to all the genders. One needs a valid age proof to board the compartment. Failure to do so may result in a penalty.Luggage: heavy goods and luggage can be transported using this compartment. These compartments are spacious and only have seats along the walls and are made to haul goods.

There are also women-only cars (termed ladies special), and since 1992, Ladies Special trains with the entire train seats reserved for women passengers. A semi ladies special is a train with a few (e.g., 3) coaches reserved for women. These designations can be combined with fast, slow, etc. with terms such as Slow Ladies Special.

Air-conditioned
The Mumbai Suburban Railways are known for their open doors and windows. This is because there is no ventilation system on the trains, and the train relies on natural air ventilation. This was introduced as a cost-saving measure, as an air-conditioning system would be rendered useless during rush hour. Leaving the doors open also allows for a fast boarding process, as the trains stop for only 10 seconds, to combat overcrowding. In 2016, the Indian Railways manufactured the first local train for a journey (particularly for hot and humid summer season). This rake is manufactured at the Integral Coach Factory, Chennai. It has several new facilities, such as connected vestibules, cushioned seats, and sliding doors. AC trains are fast and slow locals and started their run from 25 December 2017 on WR and 2021 on Central Line.CR Passengers to Finally Get AC local in Next Month, Mumbai Mirror, Retrieved 22 September 2020

Ticketing

The Mumbai Suburban Railway uses a proof-of-payment fare collection system. Tickets can be purchased at every train station. Travelling without a valid ticket is an offence and if caught can result in a penalty. The penalty is steeper for passengers travelling in first class without a valid ticket.

Tickets can be bought for a single journey (one way) or a return journey. A return ticket is valid till the next day on weekdays and till Monday if purchased on a Friday. The ticket counters usually have long queues.

Tourist tickets are valid for one, three, or five days that can be purchased up to three days in advance.

Platform tickets are required to be purchased by those members of the public not boarding trains, but who wish to access the platforms at all stations, perhaps for the purpose of receiving or seeing off a passenger and also to use footbridges. These cost . A person can be penalised for non-possession of this ticket.

CVMs and ATVMs
To save time, a Coupon Booklet can be purchased and the coupons can be punched for the designated fare at Coupon Validating Machines (CVMs) at every station. The ticket fares matrix is pasted above the CVM. As of October 2012, there are approximately 575 CVMs on Mumbai Suburban Railway stations. The Central Railway network has 350 and the Western Line has 225.

In early 2015, the authorities decided to discontinue CVMs w.e.f 1 April 2015. This decision was taken due to extensive duplication of the coupons, and the lack of transparency. The coupons were also lacking a way to trace them.

There are also Smart Cards available that can be topped up (recharged with some amount) and one can use it to print tickets for themselves from an Automatic Ticket Vending Machine (ATVMs). A Season Ticket' can be purchased if one is commuting regularly. One can choose the validity of these tickets from 1-month, 3 months to a year. Season Tickets are the most cost-effective and time-efficient option for regular commuters. 

Recently, in 2022, the ATVM got a new feature, it has more payment methods. Initially, it has only the Railway Smart Card payment option. But with the new payment methods, ticketing has become much faster. It has two features, first one is BHIM UPI QR CODE (Pay by Paytm) and the second one is BHIM UPI QR CODE (Pay by Freecharge). The process is very simple, we just have to select the destination station, where we want to go and then by selecting the QR CODE option, and the displayed QR CODE needs to be scanned through the passengers with the help of any of the payment application (like Gpay, Paytm, BharatPe, Phonepe, etc). and can further proceed by making the payment and getting the ticket in your hands. Smart cards can also be recharged similarly by placing the card on the slot and accessing the QR CODE for payment. And passengers are requested to make use of Digital QR CODE based payment facility in ATVMs installed at stations for hassle free cashless payments, saving time by avoiding queues at UTS counters. It may be noted that a discount of 0.5% can be availed on renewal of suburban season tickets using UPI QR CODE.

Mobile app
The ticket counters usually have long queues. In order to bring a solution to this problem, the UTSOnMobile app was launched by railways minister Suresh Prabhu at Dadar railway station in December 2014. This app was launched initially for Android and Windows Phone, with the iOS version developed later.Railway Minister Suresh Prabhu to launch new Mobile App, Indian Express, Retrieved 22 September 2020

To use this app, the user has to sign up with his/her mobile number. After signing up, the user has the option to load the prepaid RWallet built in the app, using credit/debit cards, net banking, IMPS or private mobile-based apps. After the RWallet is loaded, the app can be used to book tickets on the entire network. Alternatively, the user may book tickets directly using credit/debit cards, net banking, IMPS, UPI, or various digital wallets such as PayTM, MobiKwik etc. for payments within the app without having to load the prepaid RWallet.

Initially, the ticket booked on the app had to be printed from the ATVMs. This step was found tedious by the commuters and was criticized. Later, in July 2015, an update for the app was launched, which made e-tickets acceptable. The update also brought technical changes, like,  the tickets could be booked only within a radius of 30m to 5 km of the origin station, and not from the platform. This move was well received by commuters, which resulted in over 50,000 downloads on the launch day.

Security
The Railway Protection Force (RPF) and the Government Railway Police (GRP) are responsible for the Security of the Mumbai Suburban Railway.

The RPF is a security force under the authority of the Indian Ministry of Railways established by the Railway Protection Force Act, 1957 has the power to search, arrest, investigate and prosecute, though the ultimate power rests in the hands of the GRP.

The GRP is the main police force established by the Railways Act, 1989. The GRP's responsibility is to observe law and order on all railway property. The force is under joint-control of the Indian Ministry of Railways and the Maharashtra Police. Its duties correspond to those of the District Police in the areas under their jurisdiction, such as patrolling, but only on railway property. It also aids and provides assistance to the Railway Protection Force

Safety issues

Doors
The Mumbai Suburban Railway is known for its open doors and windows. This is because there is no ventilation system on the trains and the train relies on natural air ventilation. This was introduced as a cost-saving measure, as an air-conditioning system would be rendered useless during rush hour. Leaving the doors open also allows for a fast boarding process and turnaround time, as the trains stop for only 10 seconds, and are at most 5 minutes apart, to combat overcrowding. Passengers often end up hanging off the edge of the footboard, off door ledges, and during rush hour can lose balance and fall to their death. Teenagers and adults also attempt to perform stunts of the doorway and door ladders, thus risking their lives. Windows also have a wired grill on them, to prevent theft and chain snatching. However, passengers frequently spit paan, mava and gutka while hanging off doors, which ends up entering through the open window grilles. There are also numerous records of people tripping and falling down every day while getting on and off the train, when the train is in motion, thus resulting in injury.

Overcrowding
Due to its extensive reach across the Mumbai Metropolitan Region, and its intensive use by the local urban population, the Mumbai Suburban Railway suffers from the most severe overcrowding in the world. Over 4,500 passengers are packed into a 12-car or 15-car rake during peak hours, as against the rated carrying capacity of around 2,000. This has resulted in what is known as Super-Dense Crush Load of 14 to 16 standing passengers per square metre of floor space.

Fatalities
On average, about 2,000 people die annually on the Mumbai Suburban Rail network; between 2002 and 2012, more than 36,152 people died and 36,688 people were injured. A record 17 people died every weekday on the city's suburban railway network in 2008.  One of the reason for accidents and deaths is overcrowding (see above). Another cause of death is passengers crossing the tracks on foot to avoid footbridges. Some passengers die when they sit on train roofs to avoid the crowds and are electrocuted by overhead electric cables, or fall while hanging from doors and window bars. However, fatality rates have declined in 2018. To reduce the risk of such fatalities, longer platforms, and more frequent trains are being implemented.

Central Railways in association with a behaviour architecture firm deployed psychology-based interventions at the Wadala station, reducing fatalities by about 75%. Times of India carried a news item regarding the success of this experiment.

In 2010, Western Railway has pledged that its trains will stop running if "even a single person" is seen travelling on the roof.

In mid-2011 a viral video depicted a youth performing stunts while dangling from the compartment of a Harbour Line train. Following this, a boy was killed while imitating the actions performed in the video.

The Western and Central Railways have been using the Auxiliary Warning System (AWS), a type of Train Protection & Warning System (TPWS), since 1996, not dissimilar to the Automatic warning system of England.

The Central Railway and Western Railway introduced a Blue Light (Virtual Gate) concept, The Blue beam light unit which will be mounted on the top of each Gate, which Guide the Commuter for Safe Boarding, avoid overcrowding and Safe clearance in the Platforms. It also helps to create a Cultural Transformation in the Behavior of the Commuter.

Terrorism
The Mumbai Suburban Railway has suffered 8 blasts and around 368 people are believed to have died as a result.
 13 March 2003 – A bombing in a train in Mulund killed 20.Ten Convicted in 2003 Mulund Blasts Case, The Hindu, Retrieved 22 September 2020
 11 July 2006 – A series of seven bombs in Western Railway trains killed 209 persons.
 26 November 2008 – Chhatrapati Shivaji Terminus was attacked during the 2008 Mumbai Attacks killing at least 60 people.

Tourism
Tourist usage of the Mumbai Suburban Railways has seen popularity as a way to explore the day-to-day life of the city, and as such, the Central Railway has issued circulars advising tourists not to travel in the trains from 07:00 to 11:00 and 17:00 to 22:00 during weekdays because of overcrowding.

Expansion

To enable the Mumbai Suburban Railway to meet the demands of the ever-growing passenger traffic, the federal Government of India's Ministry of Railways and the state Government of Maharashtra have jointly envisioned the constitution of a separate corporate entity to operate the system.

The cost of the rail component of the project is to be shared equally by the Ministry of Railways and the Government of Maharashtra.

MRVC under the Mumbai Urban Transport Project-II is completed the Harbour Line up to Goregaon. Further extension of this line has been accepted under MUTP-III till Borivali.

CR has proposed constructing a 22.5 km line linking Nerul / CBD Belapur with Uran. The proposed line would have 10 stations.

This distance is 132 km regular, meeting the Indian Railways criteria for EMU services CR has announced that it will carry out trial runs, however it has difficulty due to the Kasara Ghat tunnels.

In popular culture

Film
The Mumbai Suburban Railway has regularly been used for film shoots. Some movies that have used the Mumbai Suburban Railway for filming are:

 Ghulam (1998 film) Slumdog Millionaire Agneepath 
 Wanted Gangs of Wasseypur Life In a Metro 
 Ghanchakkar O Kadhal Kanmani 
 Once Upon a Time in Mumbai Again 
 Rajjo 
 RaOne 
 Thalaivaa Dombivali Fast Balkadu  Mumbai Meri Jaan The Train Yeh Jawani Hai Deewani Saathiya'
Zhombivali
Baaton Baaton Mein
Badlapur
Ek Chaalis ki Last Local

Network map

See also
Urban rail transit in India

Mumbai Metro
Mumbai Monorail
Salsette–Trombay Railway
Hyderabad Multi-Modal Transport System
List of Mumbai Suburban Railway stations
11 July 2006 Mumbai train bombings
M-Indicator

References

External links
 
 Mumbai Rail Vikas Corporation Mumbai Rail Vikas Corporation

 
Transport in Navi Mumbai
Airport rail links in India
1853 establishments in British India
Indian companies established in 1853
Railway companies established in 1853
25 kV AC railway electrification